Zerachiah ben Isaac ha-Levi Gerondi, called the ReZaH, RaZBI or Baal Ha-Maor (author of the book Ha-Maor) was born about 1115 in the town of Gerona, Catalonia, Spain – hence the name Gerondi – and died after 1186 in Lunel. He was a famous rabbi, Torah and Talmud commentator and a poet.

Biography 
Zerachiah was born into a Rabbinic family called Yitzhari of Gerona. His father was Isaac Ha-Levi, a Talmudic scholar in Provence, and the son of Zerachiah Ha-Levi, his namesake.   The elder Zerachiah  was a son of Shem Tov Ha-Levi, one of the greatest Talmudic scholars in Provence, who claimed direct descent of the prophet Samuel, who according to Jewish tradition was a direct descendant of Yitzhar (hence the family name "Ha-Yitzhari"), son of Kehath, son of Levi, son of Jacob.

In his youth, Zerachiah moved to Provence and studied with the Talmudic scholars of Narbonne (one of them was the famous Moshe ben Yosef). At the age of 19 he wrote a piyyut in Aramaic and devoted himself to halakhic problems. For many years thereafter he lived in Lunel (studying with Meshullam of Lunel), but the conflicts, disputes and quarrels constantly splitting the community forced him to leave.

Zerachiah was not only a thorough Talmudist of great erudition, with an analytic and synthetic mind, but he was also deeply versed in Arabic literature, in philosophy, and in astronomy, and was, also, a gifted poet, combining elegance of style with elevation of sentiment. Judah Ben Saul Ibn Tibbon said of Zerachiah: "he was unique in his generation and wiser than I", and praised him for his elaborate style of writing. Jehudah Ibn Tibbon sent his son Samuel ibn Tibbon to study with Zerachiah.

Works

Sefer Ha-Maor 
Zerachiah knew Arabic well and quickly absorbed the disciplines studied in Provence, but from his writings one could easily feel the tension that existed between him and his surroundings. Fame of a scholar and expert on halakhic problems came to him thanks to his book Sefer Ha-Maor which was begun when he was 19 years old, and was completed in the 1180s.

The book is divided into two parts: Ha-Maor Ha-Gadol (the great light) and Ha-Maor Ha-Katan (the small light). In the first part the issues connected to Talmudic tractates "Berachot", "Mo'ed" and "Chullin" are discussed, and in the second part - "Nashim" and "Nezikin". In this book the ReZaH consistently and critically objects to the Rif's  views, but at the same time holds him and his works in high esteem. Aware of the fact that he was much younger than the "Rif" whose Halachic decisions were accepted throughout Spain, and his authority was undisputed he vindicates himself, in his prologue, by bringing examples of other young scholars who differed with acknowledged sages, such as Ibn Janach. He is most apologetic in criticizing this giant of Halacha, and justifies himself by saying that his insights serve only to enhance this indispensable code. In a comic and poetic style he writes about himself, "Do not classify this youth as an empty barrel, for ofttimes aged wine may be found in a new vessel". His father wrote a poem about him as well, praising him and blessing his creator for giving him such a gifted prodigy.

These writings belong to a special kind of Rabbinical literature - so-called "objections" raised by the scholars of Provence against attempts by the scholars from Muslim lands to force the adoption of their halakhot and commentaries. From this point of view, Zerachiah stands together with Abraham ben David  of Posquieres, known because of his objections to Maimonides. However, as Rabbi Abraham was much more accepting of the Rif, prompting his criticism of Rabbi Zerachia's criticism of the Rif, this is classification is vague at most. Zerachiah, in many cases, prefers the variants of commentaries supplemented by Rashi, and, to a great extent, he relies upon the methods of the scholars of France in commentaries on Gemara. From this point of view, the works of Zerachiah reflect a mingling of the school of halakha and the drasha of the scholars of Spain and France not uncommon in Provence.

Zerachiah's independence also displeased the conservatives, however, and refutations of his criticisms were written by Nahmanides under the title Milḥamot hashem, (lit. Wars of God) and by Abraham ben David of Posquières, who alluded in his harsh fashion to Zerahiah as an immature youth who had had the audacity to criticize his master, and even accused him of having appropriated some of his (Abraham's) own interpretations without mentioning the author. A justification of Zerahiah's critique was written by Ezra Malki under the title Shemen la-Ma'or, and since 1552 the Sefer ha-Ma'or has always been printed together with Alfasi.

Sefer Ha-Tsava 
Additionally, Zerachiah wrote the book Sefer Ha-Tsava, which explained 13 principles of drasha used in Gemarah and composed various halakhoth related to shechita and Niddah, etc.  At the same time, he endeavored to show that Alfasi had not observed the principles laid down in the Talmud for halakic interpretation.

This work, like its predecessor, was criticized by Naḥmanides, who justified Alfasi.  Major differences in opinion also emerged between Zerachiah and the Ravad III who wrote objections to the Sefer Ha-Maor. Zerachiah replied in kind, writing objections to the Ravad's work Baalei Ha-Nefesh which were full of sarcasm and personal attacks. Both the Sefer Ha-Tsava and the criticism of Naḥmanides were inserted in the Sefer Temim De'im (§§ 225, 226, Venice, 1622), and were also published separately at Shklov in 1803.

Other Works 
Zerachya was likewise the author of the following works: Hilkot Sheḥiṭah u-Bediḳah, mentioned in the Sefer ha-Ma'or at the end of the first chapter on the treatise Ḥullin; Hassagot 'al Ba'ale ha-Nefesh, a critique of RABaD's treatise on the laws relating to women, published in part with the Ba'ale ha-Nefesh (Venice, 1741; Berlin, 1762); Dibre Ribot, a controversy with RABaD on civil jurisprudence, mentioned in the Sefer ha-Ma'or on Baba Meẓi'a and cited in part by Bezaleel Ashkenazi in his Shiṭṭah Meḳubbeẓet on Baba Meẓi'a, p. 98a; Sela' ha-Maḥaloḳot, mentioned in the Sefer ha-Ma'or at the end of the first chapter of Shebu'ot; Pitḥe Niddah, quoted by the author's grandson in his Bedeḳ ha-Bayit (vii. 3); a dissertation on the Mishnah Kinnim, published at Constantinople in 1795; and responsa, mentioned in the "Sefer ha-Ma'or" at the end of the second chapter of Giṭṭin and quoted in the Sefer ha-Terumot (xlv. 1).

Zerachya was the author of numerous liturgical poems, eighteen of which are found in the Sephardic Maḥzor.  His poetry is included in various liturgical rites and was published in a critical edition by B. Bar-Tikva.

Legacy 
Zerachia Halevi influenced greatly the following generations of rabbis and scholars, and some of them wrote responsa in his defense, among them Nahmanides, who previously had been his irreconcilable critic. Even Ravad, who outlived his friend and rival by 13 years, softened his tone after Zerachiah's death and wrote about him with great respect, criticizing him only on the substance of issues under consideration.

See also

 Hachmei Provence

References

Jewish Encyclopedia bibliography 
Leopold Zunz, Z. G. p. 476;
idem, in Allg. Zeit. des Jud. iii. 679;
Sachs, Religiöse Poesie, p. 257;
Dukes, in Orient, Lit. ix. 760;
Leser Landshuth, 'Ammude ha-'Abodah, p. 63;
Reifmann, Toledot R. Zeraḥyah ha-Lewi, Prague, 1853;
Eliakim Carmoly, La France Israélite, p. 107;
Moritz Steinschneider, Cat. Bodl. cols. 2589-2593;
Fuenn, Keneset Yisrael, p. 570;
Henri Gross, Gallia Judaica, pp. 255, 282;
Michael, Or ha-Ḥayyim, p. 367, No. 826

12th-century Catalan rabbis
Jewish poets
Rabbis from Girona
Levites
1110s births
Year of birth uncertain
Year of death unknown